Xia Dong (born June 6, 1984) is a Paralympic athlete from China. He competes in throwing events in the F37 classification.

He competed at the 2008 Summer Paralympics in Beijing winning the gold medals in the F37/38 class javelin and shot put and the bronze medal in the class F37/38 discus throw. At the 2012 Summer Paralympics in London, he won a silver medal in the F37/38 discus event. In the F37/38 shot put, he won a gold medal with a world record breaking throw.

External links

References

1984 births
Paralympic athletes of China
Athletes (track and field) at the 2000 Summer Paralympics
Athletes (track and field) at the 2008 Summer Paralympics
Athletes (track and field) at the 2012 Summer Paralympics
Paralympic gold medalists for China
Paralympic silver medalists for China
Living people
Chinese male discus throwers
Chinese male javelin throwers
Chinese male shot putters
World record holders in Paralympic athletics
Medalists at the 2008 Summer Paralympics
Medalists at the 2012 Summer Paralympics
Paralympic medalists in athletics (track and field)
21st-century Chinese people